was a Japanese actress and voice actress from Tokyo.

Career 
Sasuga was born and raised in Tokyo in a family that runs a hospital. Her career began after high school when, because she did not want to practice cooking and cleaning ready for bridal training, a friend invited her to audition for a Radio drama, which she passed and debuted.

Sasuga then experienced opposition from her parents and actual marriage, and considered retiring from her career several times, but continued to work, as she had never lost any regular appearances since her debut.

Sasuga specialized in playing the roles of infants and young girls, taking advantage of her cutie voice. Because most of these roles were performed with her natural voice, a recording staff member once told her, "You can't play adult roles," which troubled her for a time, but this became an opportunity for her to master such roles. In 2012 she said in a conversation, "My voice is weird. The truth is, I am not good at listening to my voice, but I am responsible for the work I perform in and I always check them out".

In 1961, she took on the role of dubbing Jay North's Dennis Mitchell in the Japanese dub of "Dennis the Menace," which was her breakout role. As such, she was dubbed for the same role in the 1993 film by John Hughes.

Sasuga was cast as Sazae-san's character, Tarao Fuguta, Sazae's son in the longest running Anime in 1969. After that, she continued to play the role without ever being replaced, and this became her signature character. In 2019, she was recognized by Guinness World Records alongside co-stars Midori Katō (Sazae) as the "Longest career as a voice actor for the same character of an animated TV series".

From 2012 she played the role of Monomi in "Danganronpa 2: Goodbye Despair". This was the first time in her career that she appeared in a game.

Sasuga died on February 5, 2023, at the age of 87. The cause of death was undisclosed, but she was not ill and died suddenly in good health. Her posthumous work was "Sazae-san," which was recorded as usual three days before her death and broadcast on February 26.

Filmography

Television animation
Astro Boy (1964)
Princess Knight (1967 - 1968) – Tink
Humanoid Monster Bem (1968) – boy
Sazae-san (1969 - 2023) – Tarao Fuguta (first voice)
The Genie Family (1969) – Akubi
Moomin (1969) – Thingumy
Tensai Bakabon (1972) – Hajime-chan
New Moomin (1972) – Thingumy
Ganso Tensai Bakabon (1975 - 1977) – Hajime-chanRascal the Raccoon (1977) – Martha ConwayAnne of Green Gables (1979) - Lily JonesAstro Boy (1980) – GenKannagi: Crazy Shrine Maidens (2008) - Sige UemoriDanganronpa: The Animation (2013) - MonomiDanganronpa 3: The End of Hope's Peak High School (2016) - Miaya Gekkogahara (Monomi)

Film animationGauche the Cellist (1963)Nausicaä of the Valley of the Wind (1982) - girl

GamesDanganronpa 2: Goodbye Despair (2012) - Monomi, UsamiDanganronpa 1 2 Reload (2012) - Monomi, Usami
Danganronpa S: Ultimate Summer Camp (2021) - Monomi, Usami

Dubbing

Live-action film
Baby the Rain Must Fall (Margaret)
Bunny Lake Is Missing (Bunny Lake (Suky Appleby))
Dennis the Menace (Dennis Mitchell (Mason Gamble))
Giant
Now and Forever (Penny (Shirley Temple))
The Alamo
The Lion (Tina (Pamela Franklin))
The Sugarland Express (Baby Langston)

Television
Burke's Law
Bewitched
Dennis the Menace (Dennis Mitchell (Jay North))
Shane
The Fugitive (Phil (Kurt Russell))
The Man from U.N.C.L.E.
The Twilight Zone

Animation
A Boy Named Charlie Brown (1969) - Sally Brown
Groovie Goolies (1970) - Sabrina
Woody Woodpecker - Chilly Willy

References

External links
Tokyo Actor's Consumer's Cooperative Society (Haikyō) profile 

1936 births
2023 deaths
Japanese video game actresses
Japanese voice actresses
Voice actresses from Tokyo